Storm Tide (German: Sturmflut) is a 1927 German silent film directed by Willy Reiber and starring Dorothea Wieck, Helen von Münchofen and Oscar Marion.

It was made at the Emelka Studios in Munich. The film's sets were designed by Ludwig Reiber.

Cast
 Dorothea Wieck as Karen Larsen
 Helen von Münchofen as Wera
 Oscar Marion as Nils Sörren
 Harry Hardt as Andrej Michaelowitsch
 Philipp Manning as Dr. Swen Larsen, Karen's father
 Karl Platen as Perkun

References

Bibliography
 Alfred Krautz. International directory of cinematographers, set- and costume designers in film, Volume 4. Saur, 1984.

External links

1927 films
1927 drama films
German drama films
Films of the Weimar Republic
German silent feature films
Films directed by Willy Reiber
Seafaring films
German black-and-white films
Bavaria Film films
Films shot at Bavaria Studios
Silent drama films
Silent adventure films
1920s German films